Gunnar Weman (born 25 February 1932) was Archbishop of Uppsala from 1993 to 1997. Weman is the son of Henry Weman who was the cathedral organist in Uppsala. 

He was ordained in 1958 and was stationed as a priest in Sigtuna and later in Uppsala in 1959, before he became a student and study secretary of the Swedish Church Mission Board in Uppsala. Between 1964 and 1984 he was again stationed in Sigtuna, first as curate and then rector in 1969. From 1985 to 1986 he was director and head of the Swedish Church Board for worship and evangelism. He then became bishop of the Diocese of Luleå and in 1993 Archbishop of Uppsala and Primate of Sweden. He retired in 1997. 

He has been Secretary of the National Association of Youth and Church of Sweden Christian student movement and member of the Swedish church's mission board and its executive committee. Through various assignments, he has been active for the Swedish church's worship renewal and included the secretary of the Swedish Church's liturgical committee. In 2006 he became doctor of theology with a thesis entitled Contemporary worship and medieval churches.

He was involved in Ecumenical efforts with other Christians, but his efforts to encourage goodwill to the Muslim community in Sweden met with some internal difficulties.

References 

Lutheran archbishops of Uppsala
Bishops of Luleå
20th-century Lutheran archbishops
1932 births
Living people